Beilby Lawley, 3rd Baron Wenlock  (12 May 1849 – 15 January 1912) was a British soldier, Liberal politician and colonial administrator who was the Governor of Madras from 1891 to 1896.

Early life 
Lawley was the son of Beilby Lawley, 2nd Baron Wenlock and his wife Lady Elizabeth Grosvenor, daughter of Richard Grosvenor, 2nd Marquess of Westminster. He was educated at Eton College and at Trinity College, Cambridge. He was commissioned into the Yorkshire Hussars in 1869, and rose to the rank of Captain.

Political career 
Wenlock was active in local affairs as a Justice of the Peace for the East and North Ridings of Yorkshire and as Chairman of East Riding County Council. At the 1880 general election he was elected Member of Parliament for Chester but inherited his peerage later in the year and was elevated to the House of Lords.

Governor of Madras 
In 1890, Lawley was appointed Governor of Madras by the Conservative Party which came to power in the United Kingdom. Beilby Lawley served as the Governor of Madras from 23 January 1891 to 18 March 1896. Lawley laid the foundation stone for the Nilgiri Mountain Railway which was begun in August 1891 when he was Governor. During 1891–92, the northern districts of Madras Presidency were gripped by a terrible famine. The government's persistence in continuing grain export from the districts of Ganjam and Viazgapatm made the situation even worse. Lawley established the Board of Mohammedan Education in 1893.  In 1895, Lawley laid the foundation stone for a solar observatory at Kodaikanal. The Wenlock Ward of General Hospital, Madras was established in his memory. During his tenure Madras government acquired an hospital in Mangalore and renamed as Wenlock District Hospital.

Lawley made significant enlargements to the Government House (now Raj Bahvan), Madras. Lawley also laid the foundation stone of the Madras High Court.

Later life 
In 1901 Wenlock was appointed a Privy Counsellor and made a Lord of the Bedchamber to the new Prince of Wales (later George V).
He was elected chairman of the East Riding of Yorkshire County Council in January 1902. Wenlock held the position of Vice Chamberlain to Queen Mary from 1910 until his death.

Lord Wenlock was appointed Lieutenant-Colonel of the East Riding of Yorkshire Yeomanry on 15 May 1902 and later became its Honorary Colonel. He also held the honorary colonelcies of several Volunteer units, including the 2nd East Riding Artillery Volunteers (from 30 March 1880) and its successors in the Territorial Force, the II Northumbrian Brigade, Royal Field Artillery, whose drill hall at Anlaby Road, Hull, was later named Wenlock Barracks.

Family 
In 1872 he married Lady Constance Mary Lascelles, (1852–1932), daughter of the 4th Earl of Harewood, by whom he had one daughter: Hon. Irene Constance Lawley (b. 1889). She married Colin Gurden Forbes-Adam of Skipwith, Yorkshire. The Forbes-Adam family retain the Escrick estate which they now operate as a holiday and pleasure park.

He was succeeded in the Barony by his brother Richard.

Honours and awards 
Lord Wenlock received several British Orders and decorations:

 GCSI: Knight Grand Commander of the Order of the Star of India
 GCIE: Knight Grand Commander of the Order of the Indian Empire
 KCB: Knight Commander of the Order of the Bath (civil division) – 26 November 1901
 VD : Volunteer Officers' Decoration – 19 November 1901 – for his contribution as Honorary Colonel of the 2nd East Riding of Yorkshire Volunteer Artillery (Western Division, Royal Garrison Artillery)

References

External links 
 
 

Barons in the Peerage of the United Kingdom
Eldest sons of British hereditary barons
English justices of the peace
Knights Commander of the Order of the Bath
Knights Grand Commander of the Order of the Indian Empire
Knights Grand Commander of the Order of the Star of India
Members of the Privy Council of the United Kingdom
Lawley, Beilby 3rd Baron Wenlock
1849 births
1912 deaths
Lawley, Beilby 3rd Baron Wenlock
UK MPs who inherited peerages
Yorkshire Hussars officers
I Zingari cricketers
English cricketers
Members of the Madras Legislative Council
Presidents of the Marylebone Cricket Club
East Riding of Yorkshire Yeomanry officers
People educated at Eton College